Bliss Media is a Chinese film company specializing in international film financing, production and distribution. The company was founded in 2011 and now holds offices in both Shanghai and Los Angeles. It has been involved in the investment, production and distribution process of international feature films including Hacksaw Ridge, Jackie, and Loving. Hacksaw Ridge ultimately became the highest grossing imported war film in China.

Founder
The founder of Bliss Media is Chinese American producer Wei Han. She has a background in investment banking. She has also been part of the executive producer team for the 2016 movie Jackie.

Filmography

References

Film production companies of China
Film distributors of China